

History 
The current Histology Group of Victoria & Tasmania Inc. has evolved from a group which was created several years ago, driven by a committee predominantly comprising senior Histology personnel throughout Melbourne.

The original committee comprised President: Tristan Roberts; Vice President: Sue Sturrock; Treasurer:  John Mills; Secretary: Alan Sutton; Committee: Clare Christian; Irene Giouzeppos; Piero Nelva; Mike Rentsch; Clyde Riley; Ruth Wilkinson; Jane Witte.

Their intent was to create a histology group which catered to the needs of all people with an interest in histology. This does not just mean medical scientists, which is why it was felt necessary to be independent of AIMS (Australian Institute of Medical Scientists) Histology Discussion group.  AIMS, like AACB (Australian Association of Clinical Biochemists) and ASM (Australian Society of Microbiologists), but unlike AACB and ASM, the primary concern is for local members, those in Victoria. Being affiliated with AIMS, however, has proven to be of mutual benefit to both organisations.

In 1998, with Tristan Roberts at the helm, the Histology Group of Victoria (affectionately known as the HGV) became an incorporated group.  The HGV Inc. still remains a non-profit organisation with over 500 members subscribing to its bi-monthly newsletter Paraffinalia.

Activities
The HGV runs a number of educational scientific meetings throughout the year as well as social events.

In 2007 the HGV "gossip" column "Embed with Madonna" was retired from the Bi-monthly newsletter Paraffinalia.
Travelling Europe was the reason given for Madonna's "retirement". Madonna's farewell column was published in the June 2007 edition of Paraffinalia.

See also
 Anatomical pathology
 Histopathology
 Pathology
 Staining of biological tissue
 Publications in Histology
 Clinical pathology
 Forensic pathology
 Veterinary pathology
 Plant pathology
 Biopsy
 Frozen section procedure
 Immunohistochemistry

External links
 Histology Group of Victoria homepage

Histologists